Henry Hakewill (4 October 1771 – 13 March 1830) was an English architect.

Biography

Early life
Henry Hakewell was a pupil of John Yenn, RA, and also studied at the Royal Academy, where in 1790 he was awarded a silver medal for a drawing of an aspect of Somerset House.

Career

He began work on a country mansion and eventually had a large and flourishing practice, mostly concerned with country houses. In 1809, he was appointed architect to Rugby School, where the gothic buildings and chapel are his designs. He also did work for the Radcliffe trustees at Oxford and the Middle Temple.

Hakewill designed two notable Greek Revival buildings. Coed Coch, Dolwen, Denbighshire, Wales, a country house with a diagonally-placed portico (now demolished) and stair, was completed in 1804. St Peter's Church, Eaton Square, London was built in 1824–7. (It was rebuilt after a fire in 1987.)

Personal life
On 14 November 1804 Hakewill was married to Anne Sarah Frith, daughter of Rev. Edward Frith of North Cray, Kent. They had seven children including two sons who became architects: John Henry Hakewill (1810–80), and Edward Charles Hakewill (1816–72).

Publications

References and sources

References

Sources

External links

1771 births
1830 deaths
19th-century English architects